Héctor Fernández Fernández-Nespral (born 8 February 1993) is a Spanish footballer who plays for Unionistas de Salamanca CF as a central midfielder.

Club career
Born in Oviedo, Asturias, Héctor joined Real Oviedo's youth setup in 2004, aged 11. He made his senior debut with the reserves on 10 March 2012, coming on as a second-half substitute in a 0–1 home loss against CD Cudillero in the Tercera División championship.

In November 2012, Héctor was loaned to Astur CF until the end of the season. After returning from his loan stint, he was a regular starter for the B-side in the fourth tier, scoring a career-best nine goals in the 2015–16 campaign.

On 4 June 2016 Héctor made his professional debut, starting in a 0–5 away loss against CA Osasuna in the Segunda División championship. On 19 August, he was definitely promoted to the main squad.
For 2017/2018 season Nespral moved to UP Langreo and was able to promote to the Segunda División B.

References

External links

1993 births
Living people
Footballers from Oviedo
Spanish footballers
Association football midfielders
Segunda División players
Tercera División players
Real Oviedo Vetusta players
Real Oviedo players
UP Langreo footballers
Barakaldo CF footballers
Unionistas de Salamanca CF players